Artillery shelling of the "Donetskhirmash" transport stop in Donetsk is a mortar shelling of a transport junction on January 22, 2015 in the Leninskyi district of Donetsk, captured by pro-Russian separatists groups during the war in eastern Ukraine. The shelling is classified as a terrorist act.

As a result of the shelling, 8 people died, 13 more were injured. The fact of shelling was also used by the Russia's controlled militants as an excuse to publically humiliate some Ukrainian prisoners of war.

Incident 
January 22, 2015 at 09:00 Kyiv time on the Kuprin street public transport stop "Zavod Dongormash" was shelled. The first volley fell on the tram tracks, 300 meters from the ring. The next covered the very last public transport stop. The ammunition hit the roof of the shop next to the bus stop.

According to eyewitnesses, "there were four volleys around half past nine in the morning. People were hit as if mowed down, windows were blown out in the houses nearby. Two people died at the bus stop, two people were also killed in the trolleybus.Immediately after the shelling, the Russia's controlled militants staged a "parade of POWs": a column of 17 Ukrainian military prisoners of war, among whom was Oleg Kuzminykh, was brought to the scene of the tragedy. Militants punched him in the face in front of video cameras, publicly accused him of a crime. The militants forced the prisoners to carry the bodies of the dead.

According to preliminary data from OSCE observers, at least 7 people died at the scene, more than 20 were injured. As of 4:00 p.m. on January 22, the OSCE published data obtained from the Donetsk morgue, stating 8 dead.

Two days after the shelling, on January 24, 2015, observers from HumanRightsWatch reported that the sinkholes at the site of the shelling had been filled in by order of the "local authorities"(extremists by Ukrainian law), making their examination no longer possible.

Qualification of events

Ukraine 
According to the reports of the Ministry of Defense of Ukraine, the artillery shelling took place at a distance of 15 km from the places of deployment of ATO forces. The agency claims that the shelling involved representatives of terrorists who opened fire from residential areas of Donetsk.

Adviser to the Minister of Internal Affairs, Anton Gerashchenko, said on his personal Facebook page that Ukrainian aviation was not used and that the distance of the security forces to the place of shelling was considerable. He also noted that the explosions were from low-powered ammunition. Anton Gerashchenko blamed Russia for the shelling. ATO spokesman Andriy Lysenko said that the nearest ATO forces are in the village of Pisky, and this is beyond the reach of weapons of this type.

The Prosecutor's Office of the Donetsk region qualifies the shelling of public transport in Donetsk as a terrorist act. Criminal proceedings have been opened under Part 3 of Art. 258 of the Criminal Code of Ukraine. The prosecutor's office of the Donetsk region said that they have operational information from witnesses about a truck with a mortar, which, being in the Kuibyshev district, fired artillery in the direction of the Leninsky district of Donetsk, after which it continued to move towards the city center.

On the evening of January 22, Prosecutor of the PGU Vitaly Yarema in an interview on radio "Era" said that according to the prosecutor of the Donetsk region, 9 people were killed and 7 were injured.

OSCE 
As the OSCE monitoring group reported, at 11:00 a.m. it analyzed two funnels and established that "the projectiles were fired from the northwest direction." The commission also established that "the weapon used in the shelling was a mortar or an artillery installation".

Russia 
A number of pro-Russian resources immediately after the shelling called it a probable shelling with 82-mm mortar mines. Citing a member of a pro-Russian armed formation, they also reported that pro-Russian forces were "looking for a subversive group" and that a plan to intercept garbage trucks and trucks had been announced in the city.

Despite the fact that Donetsk does not belong to the territory of the Russian Federation, on January 22, 2015, Russia opened a criminal case. This was done by the Main Investigative Department of the Investigative Committee of Russia on the death of Donetsk residents.

Investigation

Independent investigations 
Based on the photos and videos taken at the scene of the shooting, several independent investigations were conducted: Livejournal user timberhead and author of the blog Ukraine@war DajeyPetros. Both researchers based on the position and shape of the craters, as well as thanks to a good shot by Christopher Miller, who captured a close-up of the sinkhole next to a phone with a compass, state the direction of shelling from the north-northwest, which coincides with the conclusions of the OSCE. DajeyPetros concludes that the size of the hole in the ground, which is smaller than a phone, indicates the type of ammunition - an 82 mm mine.

The InformNapalm team also drew attention to the fact that local residents reported the mortar shelling that took place immediately before the tragedy from the city quarters, in particular, the likely locations were voiced: "from the area of the Motodrom", "from the area of the toy factory".

Reaction

Ukraine 

 The head of the Ministry of Foreign Affairs of Ukraine Pavlo Klimkin said on Twitter:

 Prime Minister of Ukraine Arseniy Yatsenyuk placed responsibility for the event on Russia: "Today, Russian terrorists again committed a terrible act against humanity. Russia is responsible for this." The head of the Donetsk regional state administration Oleksandr Kikhtenko condemns the illegal and inhumane actions of the separatists and expresses deep condolences to the victims.

Other states 

 The Minister of Foreign Affairs of the Russian Federation Sergey Lavrov expressed his condolences to the relatives of the victims and wished the injured residents a speedy recovery. In his statement, he also condemned the shelling, and accusing the Ukrainian.

The President of Lithuania Dalia Hrybauskaitė expressed her support for Ukraine in this difficult situation. In her Twitter microblog, she noted that "Ukrainian citizens are paying a high price for the occupation and brutal aggression. Lithuania supports Ukraine".

The US ambassador to Ukraine, Jeffrey Payette, said in his Twitter microblog that he was "shocked by the photos of the trolleybus attack. The implementation of the Minsk agreements can stop the violence".

The French authorities said they were stunned by the shelling of the bus stop. France once again called on all parties to immediately and conscientiously implement the Minsk and Berlin agreements.

International organizations 

At the briefing, the deputy head of the OSCE mission, Alexander Hag, said that representatives of the mission are at the site of the shelling and are checking the data. He also expressed his condolences for the placement of weapons in residential areas in Donetsk.

The international legal organization "Amnesty International" stated that "the mortar shelling of a trolleybus in Donetsk is a violation of international law and should be impartially investigated." The organization also noted that "both sides of the conflict are not taking the necessary measures to protect the civilian population.".

This terrorist attack, together with the attack on a bus near Volnovakha and the shelling of Mariupol, formed the basis of the film "Black January" from the series City of Heroes, produced by Public Television of Azov.

See also 

 Volnovakha bus attack 
 January 2015 Mariupol rocket attack
 Malaysia Airlines Flight 17
 Izolyatsia prison
 February 2015 Kramatorsk rocket attack
 Murder of Pentecostals in Sloviansk
 Novosvitlivka refugee convoy attack
 Russian-Ukrainian war 2014-2022

References 

Russian war crimes in Ukraine
History of Donetsk
January 2015 events
Terrorist incidents in 2015
Terrorist incidents in Ukraine
Webarchive template wayback links
Russo-Ukrainian War crimes